Lythrum intermedium is a species of flowering plant belonging to the family Lythraceae.

Its native range is Temperate Asia.

References

intermedium